El Cenepa is a district of the province of Condorcanqui in Peru. The district of El Cenepa, created on September 1, 1941 by Law Nº 9364, belongs to the province of Condorcanqui, department of Amazonas. It has an area of 5,558 km2, which represents 24% of the territory of Alto Marañón. El Cenepa has 8,363 inhabitants, and a population density of 1.5 inhabitants/km2.

Localities within the district include: 
 Shamatak

1941 establishments in Peru
Districts of the Condorcanqui Province
Districts of the Amazonas Region